Dr. Ronda Chervin (born 1937, New York City) is a Catholic author, international speaker and Professor of Philosophy. She is the author of over 60 books concerning the matters of Catholic thought, practice and spirituality, including Taming the Lion Within: 5 Steps From Anger to Peace, Last Call: Fourteen Men Who Dared Answer, and her autobiography, En Route to Eternity. A widow, mother and grandmother, she is originally from New York.

Coming from a Jewish — though atheistic — background, Chervin converted to the Catholic faith when she was a young adult. She graduated from Fordham University with a Ph.D. in Philosophy and earned an MA in Religious Studies from Notre Dame Apostolic Institute.  While at Fordham, Chervin studied under Dietrich von Hildebrand. Since then, as a professor of philosophy, she has taught at numerous colleges, including Loyola Marymount University, the Seminary of the Archdiocese of Los Angeles, the Franciscan University of Steubenville, and Holy Apostles College and Seminary in Cromwell, CT.  She frequently presents on Catholic TV and Radio.

References

External links
Official website
Ronda Chervin at Corpus Christi Watershed.

1937 births
Living people
American Roman Catholics
American women philosophers
Converts to Roman Catholicism from atheism or agnosticism
Catholic philosophers
Roman Catholic writers
American people of Jewish descent
Fordham University alumni
American women non-fiction writers
21st-century American women